Marjorie Katherine "Midge" Gladman Van Ryn (née Gladman; June 21, 1908 – November 9, 1999) was an American amateur tennis player in the early part of the 20th century.

Gladman played collegiate tennis at the University of Southern California. She was ranked in the U.S. top 10 nine times between 1928 and 1937, with her highest ranking at No. 4 coming in 1937.

She won the doubles title at the 1936 U.S. National Championships, partnering Carolin Babcock, and was a doubles finalist in 1937 and 1940.

In 1928, she won the singles title in Cincinnati (defeating Clara Louise Zinke in the final), the Canadian National singles title, and the Western singles championship. She paired with Zinke to win the 1928 Western doubles title. In 1929, she won the singles and doubles titles at both the women's intercollegiate tournament in Boston and the Middle States singles title in Philadelphia. She also won the Delaware State singles title and was a finalist in doubles and mixed doubles there.

In 1931 and 1936, she participated in the Wimbledon Championships and reached a fourth round in the singles (1931), a quarterfinal in the women's doubles (1931), and a fourth round in the mixed doubles (1936). In March 1936 she won the  U.S. Indoor Championships defeating Norma Taubele in straight sets. At the same tournament she won the doubles title in 1932, 1949, 1950, 1951 and 1960.

On 22 October 1930, she married John Van Ryn, who was inducted into the International Tennis Hall of Fame in 1963. The marriage did not last, and on March 1, 1947, she married Richard Buck.

In 1954, she was presented with the USTA Service Bowl Award, and in 1991, she was inducted into the USTA New England Hall of Fame.

Grand Slam finals

Doubles (1 title, 3 runner-ups)

Mixed doubles (1 runner-up)

References

1908 births
1999 deaths
American female tennis players
Tennis players from Santa Monica, California
United States National champions (tennis)
USC Trojans women's tennis players
Grand Slam (tennis) champions in women's doubles
20th-century American women